Wolfram Mathematica is a computer algebra system and programming language.

Mathematica may also refer to:
Mathematica Inc. (1968–1986), a defunct research and software company
 Mathematica Inc., a policy research organization spun-off from the above company, formerly known as Mathematica Policy Research
Philosophiæ Naturalis Principia Mathematica, Newton's book on the basic laws of physics
Mathematica: A World of Numbers... and Beyond, interactive mathematics exhibit (1961) designed by Charles and Ray Eames
Principia Mathematica, Whitehead and Russell's work on axiomatizing mathematics

See also
Mathematics (disambiguation)